Oxylobium arborescens, commonly known as the tall shaggy-pea, is a species of flowering shrub to small tree in the family Fabaceae and is endemic to south-eastern Australia. It has elliptic dark green leaves and yellow pea flowers.

Description
The upper surface is covered in warty protuberances, smooth with veins, underside covered in soft, matted hairs, and tapering to a sharp, short point. The yellow flowers are in short racemes borne at the end of branches or in the leaf axils. Flowering occurs in spring and summer.

Taxonomy
Oxylobium arborescens was first formally described in 1811 by Robert Brown and the description was published in Hortus Kewensis. The specific epithet (arborescens) means "tending to a tree-like form".

Distribution and habitat
Tall shaggy-pea is an uncommon shrub growing in gullies and sheltered forests mostly on ranges.

References

Mirbelioids
Fabales of Australia
Flora of Tasmania
Flora of New South Wales
Flora of Queensland
Flora of Victoria (Australia)